Caudillo is a documentary film by Spanish film director Basilio Martín Patino. It follows the military and political career of Francisco Franco and the most important moments of the Spanish Civil War. It uses footage from both sides of the war, music from the period and voice-over testimonies of various people.

See also 
 Franco, ese hombre

External links 
Caudillo in Patino's web page 

Documentary films about politicians
Documentary films about the Spanish Civil War
Spanish documentary films
1974 films
1974 documentary films
Films directed by Basilio Martín Patino
Films about Francisco Franco
Falangist works
1970s Spanish films
1970s Spanish-language films